Macrocybe spectabilis is a species of mushroom-forming fungus. It is found in Mauritius, Japan,  and Hawaii. It is associated with sugarcane. It and Macrocybe titans contain large concentrations of cyanide. This mushroom is listed 食用 (edible) in the book きのこ ("Mushrooms") in the series "New Yama-Kei Pocket Guide."

References

Fungi described in 1973
Fungi of Mauritius
Fungi of Japan
Fungi of Hawaii
Tricholomataceae
Fungi without expected TNC conservation status